Lichtman's, officially known as Lichtman's News and Books, was a Canadian chain of independent bookstores. The company was established in 1909 with the opening of a shop in Toronto.

It filed for bankruptcy protection under the Bankruptcy and Insolvency Act in March 2000. President Gerry Ruby stated that the company was losing sales to big box retailers Chapters and Indigo Books and Music, and internet retailers such as Amazon.

In the preceding four years, the company's annual revenues had declined from $13.5 million to $9 million. The company shifted focus to selling specialty publications in an attempt to staunch the declining revenues, but was ultimately unsuccessful. Moreover, it was refused a renewal of its lease at Bayview Village because the landlord had guaranteed a new Chapters outlet it would be the only bookstore at that location.

References

Independent bookstores of Canada
Bookstores established in the 20th century
Canadian companies established in 1909
Retail companies established in 1909
1909 establishments in Ontario
Retail companies disestablished in 2000
2000 disestablishments in Ontario